A reasoner is a piece of software able to infer logical consequences from a set of asserted facts or axioms.

Reasoner may also refer to:
 20474 Reasoner, a main-belt asteroid
 New Reasoner, a political magazine
 Reasoners Run, a stream in Ohio, U.S.
 Solver, software that solves a family of mathematical problems by inferring consequences from logical rules
 USS Reasoner (FF-1063), a Knox class frigate

People with the surname
 Elsie Reasoner Ralph (1878–1913), first American female war correspondent
 Frank S. Reasoner (1937–1965), United States Marine Corps officer
 Harry Reasoner (1923–1991), American journalist
 James Reasoner (21st century), American novelist
 Marty Reasoner (born 1977), American ice hockey player
 Mike Reasoner (21st century), American politician